is a Japanese political journalist, best known for hosting TV Asahi's Sunday Project program.

Career
Born in Shiga Prefecture, Tahara attended Waseda University and began his career at Iwanami Productions, a documentary film production company. He later moved to TV Tokyo where he made a series of groundbreaking television documentaries, before turning freelance in 1976.

In 1971, he co-directed with Kunio Shimizu the fiction film Lost Lovers (Arakajime Ushinawareta Koibitotachi yo) for Art Theatre Guild, which starred Renji Ishibashi and Kaori Momoi.

References

External links 
 

Japanese television journalists
Japanese documentary filmmakers
Waseda University alumni
People from Shiga Prefecture
1934 births
Living people